The chestnut goby (Chromogobius quadrivittatus) is a species of goby found in the Mediterranean and Black Sea. In the Black Sea it is found in the Gulf of Varna, saline lagoons near Abrau, also near Novorossiysk and Sochi.  This species occurs in shallow, coastal waters.  It can reach a length of  SL.

References

External links
 

Fish of the Adriatic Sea
Fish of the Mediterranean Sea
Fish of the Black Sea
Fish of Europe
Fish of Western Asia
Fish of Russia
Chromogobius
Fish described in 1863